New Amsterdam - Live at Heineken Music Hall is the second live album by American rock band Counting Crows, released by Geffen Records on June 19, 2006, in the United Kingdom and the following day in the United States. The live performance was recorded in the Heineken Music Hall in Amsterdam, The Netherlands between February 4–6, 2003.

Reception
AllMusic's Thom Jurek praised the release, stating that it "feels warts-and-all, like a special kind of bootleg," that ultimately gives an insight into vocalist and lyricist Adam Duritz's state of mind. Jurek states that the track listing, "as strange and beguiling as it is, is a flawed and fitting testament to the Counting Crows' continued trudge out there on the margins of rock & roll."

Track listing

All tracks written by Adam F. Duritz unless otherwise indicated.

"Rain King" (Duritz, David Bryson) – 7:23
"Richard Manuel is Dead" (Duritz, Daniel J. Vickrey, David Immerglück, Charles Gillingham, Matt Malley) – 3:57
"Catapult" (Duritz, Malley, Vickrey, Ben Mize, Bryson, Gillingham) – 3:40
"Goodnight L.A." – 4:29
"Four White Stallions" (Jeff Trott, Patrick Winningham, Vickrey) – 4:11
"Omaha" – 3:49
"Miami" (Duritz, Gillingham, Immerglück) – 5:11
"Hazy" (Duritz, Gemma Hayes) – 2:54
"Good Time" – 5:13
"St. Robinson in His Cadillac Dream" – 5:20
"Perfect Blue Buildings" – 5:04
"Hanginaround" (Duritz, Vickrey, Mize, Bryson) – 5:29
"Goodnight Elisabeth" – 8:13
"Hard Candy" (Duritz, Vickrey, Gillingham) – 4:53
"Holiday in Spain" – 4:44

Bonus tracks
"Mr. Jones (Live at the Ahoy)" (UK version) (Duritz, Bryson)
"Blues Run the Game" (Barnes & Noble bonus track, also available on UK, Dutch and Brazilian versions) (Jackson C. Frank) – 3:56
"Big Yellow Taxi" (Best Buy bonus track) (Joni Mitchell) – 3:46
"Black and Blue" (iTunes bonus track)

Personnel
Counting Crows
Jim Bogios – drums, backing vocals
David Bryson – guitar, backing vocals
Adam Duritz – vocals, piano
Charlie Gillingham – piano, Hammond B-3 organ, keyboards, backing vocals
David Immerglück – guitar, mandolin, pedal steel, backing vocals
Matt Malley – bass guitar, piano, backing vocals
Dan Vickrey – guitar, backing vocals

Recording personnel
François Lamoureux – recording
Pat Morrow – recording coordinator
Bob Clearmountain – mixing
Brandon Duncan – mixing assistant
Kevin Harp – mixing assistant
Bob Ludwig – mastering

Artwork
Felipe Molina – album art
Frank Olinsky – design

References

External links

Counting Crows live albums
2006 live albums
Geffen Records live albums